The canton of Villerupt is an administrative division of the Meurthe-et-Moselle department, northeastern France. Its borders were modified at the French canton reorganisation which came into effect in March 2015. Its seat is in Villerupt.

It consists of the following communes:

Bréhain-la-Ville
Crusnes
Errouville
Fillières
Hussigny-Godbrange
Laix
Longlaville
Morfontaine
Saulnes
Serrouville
Thil
Tiercelet
Villers-la-Montagne
Villerupt

References

Cantons of Meurthe-et-Moselle